Showtime Greats (previously Encore) was an Australian cable and satellite television channel which was available on the Foxtel, Austar and Optus Television subscription television platforms.

Showtime Greats broadcast films dating from the 1960s to the early 2000s. These films were older films which had previously premiered on sister channel Showtime premiere. Prior to March 2004, the channel was known as Encore and aired much older films.

The channel was closed on 15 November 2009 and was replaced by three themed channels.

See also
 Showtime movie channels
 Showcase

References

Movie channels in Australia
Defunct television channels in Australia
Television channels and stations established in 1995
Television channels and stations disestablished in 2009